Oberstreu is a municipality  in the district of Rhön-Grabfeld in Bavaria in Germany.

Mayor
In March 2020 Stefan Kießner was elected mayor.

References

Rhön-Grabfeld